Do It All is the fourth album by American bass guitarist Michael Henderson, released in 1979 on Buddah Records.

Track listing
All tracks composed by Michael Henderson; except where indicated
"Playing On the Real Thing"  4:18
"Everybody Wants to Know Why" (Herman Curry, Jr)  3:13
"To Be Loved" (Berry Gordy, Tyran Carlo)  4:44
"Do It All" 5:17
"In the Summertime" (Michael Henderson, Randall K. Jacobs)  4:09
"Wait Until the Rain" 7:19
"Riding" 5:21

Personnel
Michael Henderson – lead and backing vocals, bass
Randall Jacobs – guitar
Bobby Franklin, Cory Heath, Keith Benson, Ollie E. Brown – drums
Rudy Robinson, David Lee – keyboards, synthesizer
Anthony Jones, Jimmy Williams – percussion
D.J. Vassal Benford – clavinet
Eli Fontaine – saxophone
Evan Solot – trumpet
Little Sonny – harmonica
Barbara Ingram, Yvette Benton, Paula Benson – backing vocals

Charts

Singles

References

External links
 Michael Henderson-Do It All at Discogs

1979 albums
Michael Henderson albums
Buddah Records albums
Albums recorded at Sigma Sound Studios